Meteorological intelligence is information measured, gathered, compiled, exploited, analyzed and disseminated by meteorologists, climatologists and hydrologists to characterize the current state and/or predict the future state of the atmosphere at a given location and time.  Meteorological intelligence is a subset of environmental intelligence and is synonymous with the term weather intelligence.  

The earliest known use of the term "meteorological intelligence" in a written document dates to 1854 on pg. 168 of the Eighth Annual Report of the Board of Regents of the Smithsonian Institution.  This report discusses the Smithsonian Institution's initiative to transmit meteorological intelligence via telegraph lines.  An early reference to "meteorological intelligence" in England dates an 1866 issue of The Edinburgh Review which was a prominent Scottish journal during the 19th century (Reeve 1866, pg. 75).  

Another documented, early use of the term dates to 1874 in a historical compilation entitled, "The American Historical Record" (Lossing 1874, pg. 125).  In this book, Lossing uses the term to refer to weather observations transmitted over telegraph lines for the purpose of studying the nature of storms with the ultimate goal of enhancing public safety through the issuance of storm warnings.  This mission was carried out by the Army Signal Service starting in the 1870s who was responsible for communication (via telegraph) of technical intelligence for the army as well as "meteorological intelligence" for the general welfare of the country (Ingersoll 1879, pg. 156).

From the viewpoint of the intelligence community, the term meteorological intelligence is more limited in its use referring to the use of clandestine or technical means to learn about environmental conditions over enemy territory (Shulsky and Schmitt 2002) as in the North Atlantic weather war. In the military intelligence context, weather information is often referred to as meteorological or environmental intelligence (Hinsley 1990, pg. 420; Platt 1957, pg. 14; U.S. Congress, pg. 164). 

With regard to private sector meteorology, the term meteorological intelligence is a broad term of art that is primarily associated with observed and forecast weather information provided to decision makers in one of a number of weather sensitive business areas including: Energy, forestry, agriculture, telecommunications, transportation, aviation, entertainment, retail and construction (CMOS 2001, pg. 23) .  It is considered a key aspect of weather risk management for the legal and insurance industries.

Notes

See also

 Military intelligence
 Business intelligence
 Intelligence (information gathering) 
 Weather risk management

References
 Canadian Meteorological and Oceanographic Society (CMOS), 2001: "Baseline Status of Private Meteorological Services Sector in Canada", prepared by Global Change Strategies International 
 Dear, I.C.B. and Foot, M.R.D.: "meteorological intelligence." The Oxford Companion to World War II. Oxford University Press. 2001. Encyclopedia.com. (March 10, 2009).
 Hinsley, Francis F., 1990: "British Intelligence in the Second World War: Its Influence on Strategy and Operations". Cambridge University Press
 Ingersoll, Lurton D., 1879: "A History of the War Department of the United States", published by Francis D. Alohun, 613 pages
 Lossing, Benson J., ed., 1874: "The American Historical Record”, Vol. III
 Platt, Washington, 1957: "Strategic Intelligence Production: Basic Principles", published by P.A. Praeger, 302 pages
 Reeve, Henry, ed., 1866: "The Edinburgh Review", Vol CXXIV, published by Archibald Constable, London, 600 pages
 Shulsky, Abram N. and Schmitt, Gary J., 2002: "Silent Warfare: Understanding the World of Intelligence", 3rd ed., 285 pages
 Smithsonian Institution, 1854: "Eighth Annual Report of the Board of Regents of the Smithsonian Institution", published by The Institution, U.S. Gov't Print Off., 310 pages
 U.S. Congress, Office of Technology Assessment, New Technology for NATO: Implementing Follow-On Force Attack, OTA-ISC-309 (Washington, D.C.: US Government Printing Office, June 1987)
 Yokoyama, K., 1993: Studies on the utilization of the mesh meteorological intelligence, Bulletin of the Yamagata Prefectural Agricultural Experiment Station (Japan), 31-37

External links

http://www.cmos.ca/Privatesector/metstrategyappB.pdf
http://www.cdef.terre.defense.gouv.fr/publications/doctrine/doctrine03/US/doctrine/art8.pdf
http://www.scotsatwar.co.uk/AZ/dday.htm
https://books.google.com/books?id=gIzUGFtsExAC&dq=meteorological+intelligence&ei=8my2Sa_jKIHqkwTd3pn9Bg
http://www.encyclopedia.com/doc/1O129-meteorologicalintelligenc.html

Branches of meteorology
Intelligence gathering disciplines
Business intelligence
Weather hazards
Warning systems